The Abushiri revolt, also known as the slave trader revolt, was an insurrection in 1888–1889 by the Arab and Swahili population of the areas of the coast of East Africa that were granted, under protest, to Germany by the Sultan of Zanzibar in 1888. It was eventually suppressed by a German expeditionary corps which conquered the coastal area.

Background
In late 1884, an expedition of the Society for German Colonization, led by Carl Peters, had reached Zanzibar and made the local chiefs on the opposite mainland sign "protection contracts" promising vast areas to his organisation. Once it had gained a foothold, Peters' new German East Africa Company acquired further lands in Tanganyika up to the Uluguru and Usambara Mountains. That met with opposition by Sultan Barghash bin Said of Zanzibar, who nevertheless had to give in after Peters had reached the official support by the Foreign Office in Berlin and a fleet of the Kaiserliche Marine under Konteradmiral Eduard von Knorr appeared off the Zanzibar coast. On 28 April 1888, Sultan Khalifah bin Said finally signed a treaty, ceding the administration of the Tanganyika mainland to the German East Africa Company.

From August 1888, the organisation tried to take over the coastal towns of Tanganyika against the fierce resistance by the Arab elite, fearing for their slave and ivory trade, but also by the indigenous population. The haughty attempts by Emil von Zelewski, the German administrator in Pangani, to raise the company's flag over the city sparked the uprising.

Revolt
It was led by the planter Abushiri ibn Salim al-Harthi, who gained the support of both the Arabs of the area and local Swahili tribes. Abushiri's father was an ethnic Arab and his mother an Oromo. The rebellion soon spread all along the coast from the town of Tanga in the north to Lindi and Mikindani in the south. The representatives of the German East Africa Company were expelled or killed except for the establishments in Bagamoyo and Dar es Salaam.

In February 1889, German Chancellor Otto von Bismarck intervened and appointed Lieutenant Hermann Wissmann a Reichskommissar of German East Africa. Wissmann concentrated a Schutztruppe of German officers and African askari soldiers whom he hired in Egypt and Mozambique, who, with support by the navy, subsequently suppressed the revolt.

Abushiri, on his flight to Mombasa, was eventually betrayed to the Germans in December 1889 and was sentenced to death in a court-martial and publicly hanged in Pangani. By an agreement of 20 November 1890, the German East Africa Company had to hand over Tanganyika's administration to the German government. It was, however, not until early 1891 that Wissmann was able report to Berlin that the rebellion had been fully suppressed.

References 

African resistance to colonialism
History of Zanzibar
Rebellions in Africa
Military history of German East Africa
Conflicts in 1888
Conflicts in 1889
19th century in Africa
19th-century rebellions
1888 in German East Africa
1889 in German East Africa
Wars involving Germany
Conflicts involving the German Empire
Sultanate of Zanzibar